Demon Cleaner may refer to:

 Demon Cleaner (song), a song by Kyuss, from the album Welcome to Sky Valley
 Demon Cleaner (band), a Swedish stoner rock band